Kalamnuri Assembly constituency is one of the 288 constituencies of Maharashtra Vidhan Sabha and one of the three located in the Hingoli district.

It is a part of the Hingoli (Lok Sabha constituency) along with five other Vidhan Sabha constituencies, viz Basmath and Hingoli from the Hingoli district and Umarkhed (SC) from the Yavatmal district and Kinwat and Hatgaon from the Nanded district.

Members of Legislative assembly

See also
Kalamnuri

Notes

Assembly constituencies of Maharashtra